Rhizocossus munroei is a moth in the family Cossidae. It is found in Chile.

The length of the forewings is 18.5–22 mm. The forewings are grey marked with faint, slightly darker cross-striae. The hindwings are usually somewhat paler, but may be infuscated (darkened) with blackish.

Etymology
The species is named in honour of Dr. Eugene G. Munroe.

References

Natural History Museum Lepidoptera generic names catalog

Moths described in 1957
Chilecomadiinae